Devakottai is a first-grade municipality in the state of Tamil Nadu, India. Located in the Sivaganga district, the town is situated close to the Karaikudi, near Rameswaram National Highway Road (NH-210). It is one of the major cities comes under the Chettinad area with rich heritage of houses built with limestone called "Karai Veedu". This Region is one of the towns in Chettinad belt. The town is famous for its ancient temple Sri Meenakshi Sundareswarar temple also known as Nagara Sivan Kovil.

As of 2011, the town had a population of 76,037.

History
The name "Devakottai" is derived from the Tamil word "Devi Kottai", meaning the fort of a Goddess.

Devakottai was an active town in the Indian Independence Movement. The municipal court of Devakottai was burned to the ground during the Quit India Movement. This leads to the town becoming one of the historical landmarks of Tamil Nadu with typical building structures and monuments.

Devakottai is now under the Karaikudi constituency following the reformation of constituencies. However, for parliamentary elections, it comes under the Sivaganga constituency.

Demographics

Devakottai is Taluk in Tamil Nadu state, Devakottai Taluk population in 2022 is 97,327. According to 2011 census of India, Total Devakottai population is 76,037 people are living in this Taluk, of which 38,448 are male and 37,589 are female. Population of Devakottai in 2021 is 94,286 Literate people are 54,080 out of 30,517 are male and 23,563 are female. Total workers are 42,674 depends on multi skills out of which 24,638 are men and 18,036 are women. Total 13,697 Cultivators are depended on agriculture farming out of 8,297 are cultivated by men and 5,400 are women. 5,900 people works in agricultural land as a labour in Devakottai, men are 3,069 and 2,831 are women. Scheduled Castes and Scheduled Tribes accounted for 8.5% and 0.16% of the population respectively. The average literacy of the town was 80.95%, compared to the national average of 72.99%. In total, the town had 13192 households. In particular, there were a total of 18,696 workers, comprising 865 cultivators, 415 main agricultural laborers, 219 in house hold industries, 14,056 other workers, 3,141 marginal workers, 53 marginal cultivators, 1,011 marginal agricultural laborers, 58 marginal workers in household industries and 2,019 other marginal workers.
As per the religious census of 2011, Devakottai had 82.85% Hindus, 9.92% Muslims, 7.% Christians, 0.02% Sikhs, 0.01% Jains and 0.2% following other religions.

Transport
Devakottai is situated on Tiruchirappalli-Rameswaram National Highway Road (NH-210). The nearest airport is in Madurai, about 92 km away. The nearest major railway station is Devakottai Road Railway Station. There are frequent bus services available in Devakottai. Regular bus services are available to all important cities of Tamil Nadu.

Culture
The town is famous for its ancient temple, Sri Meenakshi Sundareswarar temple also known as Nagara Sivan Kovil. This temple is associated with Sekkizhar, one of the famous Nayanars, who wrote Periapuranam, an epic eulogizing Lord shiva, hence the temple is also known as Sekkizhar temple. The temple is a big complex housed next to a vast sacred pond. Lord Sundareswarar and his consort Meenakshi are housed in separate shrines with separate rajagopurams. The town also has an Agraharam which locals identify to as the Sivankoil Agraharam.

The town is known for its rich and traditional culture where the community of Nagarathars play a big role. The Kandar Sasti Vizha, a festival for the rich culture of Devakottai, has been conducted by Kandar Sasti Vizha Kazhagam for the past 68 years (as of the year 2013) at the Nagara Sivan Kovil, at Devakottai.

Notable people 
Dr. Soma Valliappan Writer.
S Vasanth veteran Cinema Director.
Charles Borromeo, a track and field athlete won a gold medal at the 1982 Asian Games in Delhi with a record time of 1:46:81 seconds. He was awarded the Arjuna Award in 1982 and the Padma Shri in 1984 by the Government of India.
Justice A.R. Lakshmanan, the first Supreme Court Judge from Tamil Nadu. He was also Chief Justice of the High Court of Kerala, High Court of Andhra Pradesh. He was the president of the National Law Commission. Currently, he is the member representing Mullaiperiyar Dam Commission headed by Justice A. Anand.
M. Karpaga Vinayagam, Former Chief Justice of Jharkhand High Court.
Dr. Devakottai Ramanathan orator.

References

External links
 Devakottai Municipality

Cities and towns in Sivaganga district